Education City Stadium is a football stadium which is located in Al Rayyan, Qatar, and was built as a venue in time for the 2022 FIFA World Cup held in Qatar. The stadium is located within several university campuses at the Qatar Foundation's Education City. Following the FIFA World Cup, the stadium will retain 25,000 seats for use by university athletic teams. On 3 September 2020, the stadium hosted its first official match, played in the 2020–21 Qatar Stars League season.

The stadium is located about 7 km north-west of Doha.

Construction 
The stadium is located on the outskirts of the capital Doha and has a capacity of 40,000 seats. It has been given the nickname "Diamond in the Desert".  With 20 percent of its building materials identified as green, the stadium is among the world's most environmentally sustainable stadiums. In May 2019, Education City Stadium received a five-star GSAS rating.

The build contractor is JPAC JV, who appointed Pattern Design as the lead design architect, and Buro Happold for the engineering design.  Like other stadiums built for the purpose of the 2022 FIFA World Cup it has been criticized for the working conditions for migrant workers, by Amnesty International and certain media outlets.

On 15 March 2022, FIFA president Gianni Infantino met with Qatar Minister of Labor, Ali bin Samikh Al Marri in Doha, and discussed the labor reforms taking place in the country. On 16 March 2022 Infantino said in an interview, “I am pleased to see the strong commitment from the Qatari authorities to ensure the reforms are fully implemented across the labor market, leaving a lasting legacy of the FIFA World Cup long after the event, and benefiting migrant workers in the host country in the long term.” 

On November 1, 2022, the International Labor Organization (ILO) recognized that Qatar has “undertaken comprehensive labor reforms to improve the conditions of the hundreds of thousands of migrant workers” which have “yielded benefits for workers, employers, and the economy more broadly.” This builds upon their 2021 report that detailed the positive impact of Qatar’s new labor legislation and implementation mechanisms. Also, On November 23, 2022, Foreign Policy (an American media house) drafted a report on the latest acknowledgement of the labor reforms that Qatar initiated, as the nation has already been scrutinized for its treatment of migrant workers in the past. Reforms include the introduction of a nondiscriminatory minimum wage, the removal of barriers to change jobs, and the introduction of a worker compensation fund in 2018 that has paid out $350 million so far.

2022 FIFA World Cup
The Education City Stadium was one of eight stadiums built, renovated or reconstructed for the 2022 FIFA World Cup Qatar. The construction of the stadium was completed in June 2020, making it the third World Cup stadium to be completed. It officially opened on 15 June 2020.

History
On 30 September 2019, FIFA announced the Education City Stadium as the host of the third place match and final of the 2019 FIFA Club World Cup, with the tournament being held in Qatar. The stadium would also have hosted Liverpool’s first match in the semi-finals, but on 7 December 2019, the official opening of Education City Stadium was postponed until early 2020. Thus, Liverpool's opener, the final, and the third place match were all moved to the Khalifa International Stadium in Doha.

The 2020 FIFA Club World Cup was once again held in Qatar. The Education City Stadium was one of the venues. One second round match, one semi-final match, the third place match and the final between Bayern Munich and UANL all took place in the stadium. In 2020 the Education City Stadium hosted the East and West Zone matches of the 2020 AFC Champions League.

The stadium hosted five matches of the 2021 FIFA Arab Cup.

Recent tournament results

2021 FIFA Arab Cup

2022 FIFA World Cup
Education City Stadium hosted eight matches during the 2022 FIFA World Cup.

References

2020 establishments in Qatar
2022 FIFA World Cup stadiums
Sports venues completed in 2020
Venues of the 2030 Asian Games
Asian Games football venues